Uopini is a village in Tuscany, central Italy, administratively a frazione of the comune of Monteriggioni, province of Siena. At the time of the 2001 census, its population was 508.

Uopini is about 10 km from Siena and from Monteriggioni.

References 

Frazioni of Monteriggioni